Srinivasan Sriraman (16 November 1918 – 11 June 1993, in Madras) was an Indian cricket administrator.

Sriraman was the joint secretary of the Madras Cricket Association from 1942-1944/45, secretary of the Tamil Nadu Cricket Association (TNCA) 1954-1985, BCCI joint secretary in 1963/64 and 1964/65, secretary 1965/66 – 1969/70, vice president 1977/78 – 1984/85 and the president between 1985/86 and 1988/89.

During his tenure as TNCA secretary, Sriraman shifted the cricket ground of the Tamil Nadu cricket team from the Corporation Stadium to the Chepauk stadium through a lease arranged through his relationship with Tamil Nadu chief minister and childhood friend K. Kamaraj. India co-hosted the 1987 Cricket World Cup along with Pakistan during his tenure as the BCCI president. 

Sriraman was made the honorary life member of the Marylebone Cricket Club (MCC) in 1972. He served as an umpire in one Ranji Trophy match. He was the assistant manager on India's tour of Australia in 1977/78. A conference hall in the M.A. Chidambaram Stadium (S. Sriraman Hall) is named after him.

He died of a heart attack.

References

 Obituary in Indian Cricket 1993

External links
 Cricketarchive Statistics

1918 births
1993 deaths
Indian cricket administrators
Indian cricket umpires
Cricketers from Chennai
Presidents of the Board of Control for Cricket in India